Lola Sánchez may refer to:

Lola Sánchez (Confederate spy) (1844–1895), spy for the Confederate Army during the American Civil War
Lola Sánchez (Spanish politician) (born 1978)